Kusterdingen is a municipality in southern Germany in the state of Baden-Württemberg, approximately 30 km south of Stuttgart, in the district of Tübingen.

Geography

It is located on the so-called Härten hills above the Neckar valley, about 3 km east of Tübingen and 4 km northwest of Reutlingen.

Neighbouring municipalities

The following municipalities, city and town border to the boundary of Kusterdingen (beginning clockwise in the north): Kirchentellinsfurt, Wannweil1, City of Reutlingen1, Gomaringen, Town of Tübingen. The bordering municipalities are  part of the district of Tübingen or the district of Reutlingen1.

Subdivision

The municipality of Kusterdingen is formed by the following five villages:

 Kusterdingen
 Immenhausen
 Jettenburg
 Mähringen
 Wankheim

References

External links

 Jewish cemetery in Kusterdingen/Wankheim at "Sites of Memory"

Tübingen (district)